Paulo Antonio de Oliveira (パウリーニョ, born 16 July 1982), or simply Paulinho, is a Brazilian football striker for Oita Trinita.

Career
He started his career at Atlético Mineiro and was selected in Brazilian U-23 team in 2004. In 2005, he became the top scorer in J2 League with 22 goals. On August 31, 2009 Sport Club do Recife have signed the Brazilian forward from Japanese club Kyoto Sanga F.C.

Club career statistics
Updated to 23 February 2016.

References

External links

Profile at Oita Trinita
 CBF

1982 births
Living people
People from Cuiabá
Brazilian footballers
Brazilian expatriate footballers
Clube Atlético Mineiro players
Expatriate footballers in Mexico
Dorados de Sinaloa footballers
Expatriate footballers in Japan
J1 League players
J2 League players
J3 League players
Kyoto Sanga FC players
Ventforet Kofu players
Gamba Osaka players
Oita Trinita players
Sport Club do Recife players
Campeonato Brasileiro Série A players
Liga MX players
Association football forwards
Sportspeople from Mato Grosso